Bad Taste is a 1987 New Zealand science-fiction comedy horror film directed, produced and filmed by Peter Jackson, who also stars in and co-wrote the screenplay, along with Tony Hiles and Ken Hammon. Independently produced on a low budget, it is Jackson's first feature film. Jackson and friends take on most of the key roles, both on and off-screen. The plotline sees aliens invade the fictional New Zealand village of Kaihoro to harvest humans for their intergalactic fast food franchise, where they face off against a four-man paramilitary force. The film provided Jackson with the leverage necessary to advance in the film industry.

Since its release, Bad Taste has become a cult film and has received generally positive reviews.

Plot
The Astro Investigation and Defence Service (AIDS) sends their agents, Derek, Frank, Ozzy, and Barry to investigate the disappearance of the entire population of the town of Kaihoro. They find the town has been overrun by man-eating space aliens disguised as humans in blue shirts. Barry kills one of the aliens and is attacked by others. After Derek notifies Frank and Ozzy, he begins torturing Robert, an alien they caught earlier. Robert's screaming attracts a number of aliens in the area. Derek kills the would-be rescuers, but he is attacked by Robert and falls off a cliff ledge, to his presumed death.

Meanwhile, a charity collector named Giles is passing through Kaihoro. He is attacked by Robert, but escapes in his car. He stops at a nearby house for help. Another alien answers the door and captures Giles. He later wakes up in a tub of water filled with vegetables and is told he is about to be cooked and eaten. Derek also wakes up to find that he landed in a seagull's nest. He also finds that his brain is leaking out the back of his head, so he stuffs it back in and uses a hat to hold it in place.

That night, Frank, Ozzy, and Barry infiltrate the aliens' house and find a room filled with bloody cardboard boxes. They kill a nearby alien and Frank wears its shirt to infiltrate an alien meeting. He finds out that the residents of Kaihoro have been harvested for alien fast food and also hears of their recent hostage. Robert vomits into a bowl, which the aliens dine on, including the disguised (and disgusted) Frank. He escapes and tells the others of the plan. They sneak out to save Giles as the aliens sleep.

At sunrise, they try to leave but are attacked by the aliens, which quickly dissolves into a gunfight. Derek emerges and his hat is shot off due to the ensuing gunfire, and he starts losing more of his brain, so he uses his belt as a headband. He grabs a chainsaw from the boot of his car and heads for the alien house. As the boys leave with Giles, the alien leader (Lord Crumb) and his followers transform into their true form and follow. Ozzy uses a rocket launcher to blow up Frank's car, which has been overrun by aliens.

Frank and Ozzy hunt for Lord Crumb and kill many aliens along the way. Meanwhile, Derek kills an alien with his chainsaw and replaces the missing parts of his brain with its brain. An alien prepares to shoot Frank and Ozzy, but it is beheaded by Derek after he bursts through the wall behind it. Frank and Ozzy are shocked to see him alive.

After they escape the house, Lord Crumb shoots Ozzy in the leg and Frank fires his rocket launcher at the leader, but it misses and almost hits Derek, finally taking out a sheep in a nearby meadow. Derek is knocked out by Lord Crumb and the house transforms into a giant space ship, which blasts off into space with Derek still aboard.

On board, Derek looks out the window to see that he is leaving Earth. Crumb is then killed by Derek, who ambushes him and cuts through the alien with his chainsaw. Derek proclaims into his phone: "I'm coming to get you bastards!" He then puts on the alien leader's skin, laughing maniacally as he rockets towards the alien planet. On Earth, the rest of the group drive away into the sunset in Derek's car.

Cast

 Terry Potter as Ozzy / 3rd Class Alien
 Pete O'Herne as Barry / 3rd Class Alien
 Peter Jackson as Derek / Robert
 Mike Minett as Frank / 3rd Class Alien
 Craig Smith as Giles Copeland/ 3rd Class Alien
 Ken Hammon as 3rd Class Alien
 Costa Botes as 3rd Class Alien
 Doug Wren as Lord Crumb
 Dean Lawrie as Lord Crumb SPFX double / 3rd Class Alien
 Peter Vere-Jones as Lord Crumb's voice

Production
Much of the film was shot in and around Jackson's home suburb of Pukerua Bay in northern Wellington, using a 25-year-old 16mm Bolex camera. Originally begun as a 20-minute short film called Roast of the Day, Bad Taste was shot primarily on weekends over the course of four years, at an initial cost of around $25,000. Toward the end of the shoot the New Zealand Film Commission invested around NZ$235,000 into the film to ensure its completion. Heavily influenced by special effects pioneer Tom Savini, Jackson incorporated many absurdly gory special effects.

Peter Jackson himself plays two acting roles. In one early scene halfway down a cliff, careful editing, utilising shots taken months apart, makes it possible for the two characters, Derek and the alien Robert (both played by Jackson), to fight one another.

Bad Taste begins Jackson's penchant for using the Morris Minor in his films - Giles drives a Morris Minor. Subsequently, every car in Meet the Feebles is a Morris Minor (including a limousine) and several are seen in Braindead.

A combination of blank firing firearms and homemade weapon props were used in the film. Most of the firearm props were made using recycled aluminium and wood. The actors also had to shake them to simulate the recoil. A flash and sound effect was added later during post production.

All the alien masks in the film were baked in Peter Jackson's mother's oven.

Kaihoro, the name of the town whose inhabitants are butchered, is a Māori word coined by Jackson and his crew early in the shooting of the film. It has two parts - "kai" which means food and "horo" which means town or village. Foodtown is also the name of a New Zealand chain of grocery stores. Kai horo in Te Reo Maori means 'greedy' - but is made up of the words Kai (food) and horo (quickly) which, loosely translated, could be said to mean 'fast food', a play on the fate of the villagers.

The sheep in the film was to have played a larger role as a running gag, being surprisingly aggressive and chasing "The Boys" at various points throughout. This was reduced to the single sheep/rocket launcher moment of the final scene.

Release
The film sold to many countries after playing in the market at the 1987 Cannes Film Festival. 
Despite its wide acclaim, the film failed to impress at the 1989 NZ Film and Television Awards, winning no awards. As well as this, a TVNZ executive spoke out the next day about whether or not the film industry needed films like Bad Taste. The film did however still win favour among the country's cult film audiences.

In France, the film received 29,339 admissions.

Reception
Bad Taste received generally positive reviews. Kim Newman of Empire gave the film three stars out of five, with praise being directed to the special effects. For AllMovie, Jason Buchanan wrote that Bad Taste was "amazingly resourceful", but that it moves at such a "hyperactive" pace that "it's nearly impossible to draw a breath, much less take a moment to laugh at the revoltingly hilarious exploits." In a much less positive review, Time Out summarised that although "the film had its moments", it was not a worthwhile watch.

The film holds a 71% approval rating on review aggregator website Rotten Tomatoes, based on 21 reviews with an average rating of 6.40/10. The site's consensus reads: "Peter Jackson's early low-budget shocker boasts a disgusting premise—aliens harvesting humans for fast food—that gives the budding auteur plenty of room for gross-out visuals and absurd cleverness." On Metacritic, the film holds a score of 52 out of 100 based on reviews by 4 critics, indicating "mixed or average reviews".

Censorship
The banning of an already cut version of Bad Taste in Queensland, Australia, three weeks into its run, led to the firing and dissolution of the Queensland Film Board of Review in 1990. The film had to be trimmed for release in Australia at the time, as the OFLC felt the gore too excessive. When released on home video in Australia, the words "BANNED IN QUEENSLAND" was proclaimed on the cover. The uncut version was released by Universal Home Entertainment on DVD in 2004.

Apart from the uncut version, there is a heavily cut FSK 18-rated and an even more censored FSK 12-rated version in Germany available on DVD. The former is cut by approximately 6 minutes, the latter by approximately 10 minutes.

Home media 
The film was first released on DVD in 2001 by Anchor Bay Entertainment.

In December 2018, Peter Jackson announced that he plans to restore Bad Taste, along with his two following films Meet the Feebles and Braindead (known as Dead Alive in North America) for a possible 4K release.

Legacy 
During his acceptance speech at the 2004 Academy Awards, Jackson mentioned Bad Taste (along with Meet the Feebles), joking that it had been "wisely overlooked by the Academy."

On 15 September 2001, the Michael Fowler Centre in Wellington, New Zealand, hosted Armageddon. One of the main features for the 2001 convention was the cast of Bad Taste attending for a quick question and answer session on the main stage, and a screening of the film. The cast members who attended were; Craig Smith (Giles), Pete O'Herne (Barry), Mike Minett (Frank), Terry Potter (Ozzy), Ken Hammon (Writer, 3rd Class Alien), and Dean Lawrie (Lord Crumb SPFX Double, 3rd Class Alien).

In 2008, Empire ranked Bad Taste as the 416th greatest film of all time, based on opinions from readers and industry professionals.

See also
 Braindead (film)
 List of films shot over three or more years

References

Further reading

External links

 Badtaste.co.nz with interviews, background, DVD comparisons, media etc.; archived April 2009
 
 
 
 
 NZ On Screen page

1987 films
1987 comedy films
1987 horror films
1987 directorial debut films
1980s black comedy films
1980s comedy horror films
1980s science fiction films
1980s science fiction horror films
1980s science fiction comedy films
New Zealand satirical films
New Zealand horror films
New Zealand comedy horror films
New Zealand independent films
New Zealand science fiction films
New Zealand science fiction horror films
Films directed by Peter Jackson
Films with screenplays by Peter Jackson
Films set in New Zealand
Films shot in New Zealand
Alien invasions in films
New Zealand splatter films
WingNut Films films
Films about extraterrestrial life
Films about shapeshifting
Films shot in 16 mm film
1980s English-language films
Films produced by Peter Jackson
1980s New Zealand films